Insurgentes is a Spanish word meaning insurgents and may refer to:

Avenida de los Insurgentes, the longest avenue in Mexico City
Insurgentes (album), 2008 album by British artist Steven Wilson
Insurgentes (Mexibús), a BRT station in Ecatepec
Insurgentes metro station, subway station in Line 1, Mexico City
Insurgentes Sur metro station, subway station in Line 12, Mexico City
Teatro de los Insurgentes, theater in Mexico City
Glorieta de los Insurgentes, a roundabout station in Mexico City
Glorieta de los Insurgentes (Mexico City Metrobús), a BRT station in Mexico City

See also
Insurgent (disambiguation)